The Battle in Shakhtarsk Raion began on 16 July 2014, when the Armed Forces of Ukraine attempted to cut off insurgent supply lines from Russia. Fighting broke out around the towns of Marynivka, Dmytrivka, Stepanivka, Shakhtarsk, as well as the strategic hill of Savur-Mohyla. It later spread to the cities of Snizhne and Torez. While the battle was in progress, a civilian passenger airliner, Malaysia Airlines Flight 17, was shot down near Hrabove on 17 July. Amidst a wide counter-offensive by the insurgents and their Russian backers across Donbas, government troops were forced out of Shakhtarsk Raion on 26 August.

Events by location
From 6 April, as part of the rising unrest in Ukraine in the aftermath of the 2014 Ukrainian revolution, insurgents affiliated with the Donetsk People's Republic (DPR) captured towns and cities across Donetsk Oblast, including Shakhtarsk Raion. The raion is in a crucial position between the Donetsk and Lugansk People's Republics, and Russia. Ukrainian government forces launched an offensive against insurgent forces in Donetsk and Luhansk oblasts of Ukraine on 7 April, resulting in the War in Donbas. War reached Shakhtarsk Raion on 16 July, after insurgents retreated from most of northern Donetsk Oblast. Fighting took place across the raion, in an attempt by the government to cut-off insurgent supply lines, and to reach the crash site of Malaysia Airlines Flight 17.

Stepanivka
DPR-affiliated insurgents launched an offensive on neighbouring government-controlled Marynivka from village of Stepanivka on 16 July. Ukrainian forces said that they retook Stepanivka from the insurgents on 29 July, and then advanced towards nearby Pervomaisk. According to an 11 August report, the village appeared to have been almost completely destroyed by shelling during the fighting across the raion. Stepanivka returned to insurgent control on 14 August.

Marynivka
Marynivka is a border town located in the southern Donetsk Oblast. Its position on the border made control of it important to maintaining insurgent supply-lines. Insurgents launched an offensive on National Guard of Ukraine positions in the town on 16 July, after breaking through encirclement by government forces in neighbouring Stepanivka. Fighting also spread to the nearby village of Tarany. During this offensive, the insurgents used tanks, mortars, and anti-tank missiles against government forces. Insurgents held Marynivka until the National Guard was able to repel their offensive and force them to retreat to Stepanivka. Later on, the insurgents said that had recaptured Marynivka. Insurgent spokesman Sergei Kavtaradze said that one insurgent had been killed, while fifteen were injured. Insurgent commander Igor Girkin said that DPR insurgents destroyed two Ukrainian armoured vehicles and captured one.

Ukrainian forces came under continued attack by the insurgents in Marynivka, despite managing to hold onto control of it on 16 July. On the day after the first insurgent offensive, government forces repelled another four attacks, and destroyed three tanks, two armoured personnel carriers, and two other combat vehicles. Mortar fire from Russia rained down on the Marynivka border crossing on 25 July. Government forces said they shot down at least three Russian unmanned aerial vehicles on the same day. Insurgents said that they left the area on 31 July, after near-constant fighting with government forces. Despite this, Ukrainian positions in and around Marynivka were shelled by Grad rockets and mortars on 1 August. Insurgents launched a new offensive on Marynivka on 14 August. After fierce fighting with government forces in the vicinity of the border crossing, the town was captured by the insurgents.

Dmytrivka
On 3 August, a Ukrainian Su-25 jet was shot down near Dmytrivka, but the pilot safely ejected from his plane.

Savur-Mohyla

Savur-Mohyla is a strategically important hill near the Russia–Ukraine border, and overlooks the villages of Dmytrivka and Marynivka. DPR-affiliated insurgents used the hill to shell the government-controlled village of Marynivka on 16 July, amidst an offensive by the insurgents on that village. In response, the Air Force of Ukraine attacked insurgents positions on the hill, whilst the insurgents tried to repel this attack by firing anti-aircraft guns at Air Force aeroplanes. Government forces that were encircled near the hill tried to break out of encirclement and rout the insurgents on it. Ukrainian fighter jets were shot down near the hill on 23 July. A report by the Ukrainian government said that the shoot-downs were caused by missiles fired from Russia. Insurgent commander Igor Girkin said that DPR fighters shot down one of the planes, and that the pilot ejected. Ukrainian forces said that they retook the hill on 28 July. As a result, a corridor was created to resupply units that were trapped nearby. Intense fighting in the area continued on 31 July. Insurgents attacked Ukrainian positions on the hill from the nearby city of Snizhne on 5 August. A spokesman for the National Security and Defence Council of Ukraine said on 6 August that Ukrainian forces on Savur-Mohyla had come into contact with pro-Russian insurgents twenty-five times in the past twenty-four hours. Amidst a wide counter-offensive by insurgents forces across the Donbas on 26 August, Savur-Mohyla was recaptured by DPR-affiliated forces.

Malaysia Airlines Flight 17

All 283 passengers and 15 crew died in the shoot-down.

Shakhtarsk

According to DPR forces, a National Guard convoy entered Shakhtarsk from the north on 27 July. Air raid sirens were heard, heavy fighting erupted, and street battles took place across the city. Insurgents attacked government forces from the south, but later retreated. Reinforcements from neighbouring Snizhne arrived to assist the embattled DPR insurgents. Subsequently, the Armed Forces of Ukraine said that they had captured Shakhtarsk. Two days later, however, the DPR-affiliated insurgents said they had reasserted control over the city, and pushed Ukrainian forces to its outskirts. They also said that a large amount of Ukrainian equipment was destroyed in the fighting. An insurgent ambush killed ten Ukrainian soldiers on 31 July. According to Ukrainian officials, mortars were used to attack the troops as they were re-deploying. Fierce clashes between government and insurgent forces continued in early August. Many civilians left their homes to escape the fighting, and whilst those that remained became emotionally distressed because of constant overnight artillery bombardment. Organization for Security and Co-operation in Europe (OSCE) monitors visited Shakhtarsk on 8 August. They said that the town was "deserted", and that no shops were open. According to local residents, water was only available for two hours a day, and electrical power and gas service were non-existent. There was damage from shelling across the town, and multiple residential buildings were seen destroyed. Insurgents fended off continued attempts by government forces in late August to remove them from Shakhtarsk.

Snizhne and Torez

Snizhne and Torez are cities that are geographically located in the Shakhtarsk Raion, but which are administered separately. Violence had occurred in Snizhne prior to the battle, including a rocket attack by an aeroplane on 15 July that killed at least eleven people and damaged many homes. Ukrainian forces said they entered Torez and other nearby villages on 28 July.

They managed to hold the town only briefly, as DPR-affiliated insurgents forced them to withdraw from the area on 1 August. Clashes on the outskirts of the city continued on 7 August, after Ukrainian soldiers tried to relieve their encircled comrades near the town. According to the DPR, these attacks were repelled. Ukrainian forces advanced toward Torez again on 8 August, in an effort to prevent insurgent attacks on their positions at Savur-Mohyla.

Ukrainian forces launched a new offensive with the aim of recapturing Snizhne, Torez and Shakhtarsk on 12 August. Clashes continued in each city. On the next day, Ukrainian artillery destroyed a convoy of lorries filled with ammunition for the insurgents at Snizhne. According to two members of the Russian Presidential Human Rights Council, this convoy had been escorted by Russian military personnel, of which more than 100 were killed and about 300 wounded. Government forces tried once again to retake Torez from the insurgents on 20 August, but were repelled. Ukrainian forces destroyed eleven Grad rocket systems, three tanks, and five armoured vehicles used by the insurgents in Snizhne on 21 August. Government sources said that they also killed more than 100 Russian "mercenaries".

See also 
 Outline of the Russo-Ukrainian War

Notes

References

Battles of the war in Donbas
2014 in Ukraine
History of Donetsk Oblast
Battles in 2014
July 2014 events in Ukraine
August 2014 events in Ukraine
Battles involving the Donetsk People's Republic